Dhok Manna (U.C Narali) is a village in Rawalpindi District. It is located at 33°8'30" North, 73°10'20" East. Most of the population belong to the Gujjar and Kanyal tribe.

References

Populated places in Rawalpindi District